María Laura Fortunato (born 31 May 1985) is an international football referee from Argentina. She was an official at the 2019 FIFA Women's World Cup in France.

References

Living people
1985 births
Argentine football referees
FIFA Women's World Cup referees
Women association football referees
21st-century Argentine women